Mwigulu Lameck Nchemba (born 7 January 1975) is a Tanzanian economist and CCM politician, who serves as the elected Member of Parliament for Iramba West Constituency since 2010. On 31 March 2021, President Samia Siluhu appointed him as the Minister of Finance and Planning, replacing Philip Mpango, who was elevated to the position of Vice President of Tanzania. Before his current appointment, he served as the Minister of Law and Constitutional Afairs in the Tanzanian Cabinet, since May 2020.

Background and education
Nchemba was born on 7 January 1975 in Iramba District, in the Singida Region of Tanzania. He attended Makunda Primary School, then transferred to Iboru Secondary School for his middle school education. He completed his A-Level schooling at Mazengo Scondary School, graduating in 2000 with the equivalent of a High School Diploma.

In 2001 he was admitted to the University of Dar es Salaam, graduating with a Bachelor of Economics degree in 2004. He went on to obtain a Master of Economics degree in 2006, also from Dar es Salaam University. He later obtained a Doctor of Philosophy degree in Economics from the same university.

Career
Before joining elective Tanzanian politics, Nchemba worked as an economist at the Bank of Tanzania. Later, President Jakaya Kikwete appointed him as Minister in the Ministry of Finance and Economic Planning. His tenure at the finance ministry coincided with the "Tegeta Escrow Scandal", which involved the embezzlement of hundreds of million of dollars by high-ranking government officials. Dr Nchemba, who was not implicated, rightly maintained that the full extent of the law should apply to those involved.

He was appointed as the Minister of Agriculture, Livestock and Fisheries in December 2015, by the then incoming president John Pombe Magufuli. Following the death of Ambassador Dr Agustine Phillip Mahiga, he was appointed as the Minister of Constitutional and Legal Affairs.

Following the formation of the 6th Cabinet of Tanzania, on 31 March 2021. Dr Philip Mpango was promoted to Vice-President of Tanzania, Nchemba took over the post of the Minister of Finance.

Other activities
 World Bank, Ex-Officio Member of the Board of Governors (since 2021)

See also
 Cabinet of Tanzania
 Parliament of Tanzania
 Economy of Tanzania

References

External links 
 Profile at Parliament of Tanzania

1975 births
Living people
Chama Cha Mapinduzi MPs
Deputy government ministers of Tanzania
Tanzanian MPs 2010–2015
Tanzanian MPs 2015–2020
Tanzanian MPs 2020–2025
Ilboru Secondary School alumni
Mazengo Secondary School alumni
University of Dar es Salaam alumni
Finance Ministers of Tanzania
People from Singida Region